An air basin is an area within a ring or partial ring of mountains that in the absence of winds holds air and smog within the area.

External links
 http://encyclopedia2.thefreedictionary.com/Air+Basin

References 

Atmospheric circulation